The Gozitan Nation, commonly known as Gozo, was an unrecognised state located on the island of Gozo between 1798 and 1801 during the French Revolutionary Wars. It was a monarchy recognizing the authority of Ferdinand III of Sicily with a provisional government led by Governor-General Saverio Cassar. Its capital was Rabat. The country was established between 28 and 29 October 1798 from the territory of French-occupied Malta and was eventually incorporated into Malta Protectorate on 20 August 1801.

History

Until 10 June 1798, Malta and Gozo had been administered by the Order of Saint John. When Napoleon ousted the Knights from the islands in the Mediterranean campaign of 1798, the French established garrisons in various locations in Malta, as well as the Cittadella and Fort Chambray, the main fortifications on Gozo.

On 2 September 1798, the Maltese rebelled against the French in Mdina, requesting to return under the "Kingdom of Sicily" rule. Word spread and the Gozitans revolted on 3 September. The archpriest and parish priest of the town of Rabat, Saverio Cassar, was chosen as the revolt's leader on 18 September. The rebel headquarters was established in the Banca Giuratale (which is now the seat of the Victoria Local Council). Cassar organized the dejma and collected money to pay the troops under his command. Pro-French partisans were arrested, including three canons.

The French garrison held out in the Cittadella and Fort Chambray, until they capitulated on 28 October after negotiations which were made with the help of Sir Alexander Ball. The 217 French soldiers there agreed to surrender without a fight and transferred the island, its fortifications, 24 cannons, a large quantity of ammunition, and 3,200 sacks of flour to the British.

A day later, the British transferred control of the Cittadella and the rest of the island to the Gozitans. The people declared Ferdinand III of Sicily as their monarch, and set up a provisional government led by Saverio Cassar, who became governor-general. The provisional government included several British and Maltese representatives, and their first action was to distribute the captured food supplies to the island's 16,000 inhabitants. The Neapolitan flag (which later became the flag of the Two Sicilies) was flown over Gozo, and munitions and supplies arrived from Naples, with King Ferdinand praising his "faithful Maltese subjects."

On 29 October, Cassar requested that Gozo becomes a separate diocese. The Roman Catholic Diocese of Gozo was eventually created on 22 September 1864, 65 years after Cassar's petition. During Cassar's rule of Gozo, he organized the administration, reopened the law courts and elected new jurists; and even opened a customs house.

When the French garrison in Valletta surrendered in September 1800, the British established the Malta Protectorate. Cassar continued to rule Gozo independently until 20 August 1801, when the British civil commissioner, Charles Cameron, removed him from the position. Emmanuel Vitale, another leader of the Maltese insurrection, became governor, superintendent and the health director of Gozo, a post which he held until his death fourteen months later.

On 16 December 1805, Cassar died at the age of 58.

Notes

References

Gozo
Client states of the Napoleonic Wars
History of Malta
Island countries
Former unrecognized countries
French occupation of Malta
1798 establishments in Malta
1801 disestablishments in Malta
States and territories established in 1798
States and territories disestablished in 1801
Former monarchies